Saint-Michel-du-Squatec is a municipality in the Canadian province of Quebec, located in the Témiscouata Regional County Municipality.

On November 1, 2014, Saint-Michel-du-Squatec changed from parish municipality to a (regular) municipality.

References

External links

See also
Touladi River

Municipalities in Quebec
Incorporated places in Bas-Saint-Laurent